Claypaky S.p.A. is a developer of professional lighting systems for the entertainment sector (theatre, television, concerts, nightclubs and outdoor events ) and for architectural applications.  The company is based in Seriate, near Bergamo, about 40 km from Milan, Italy.

It operates from a modern facility housing its R&D labs, main production plant and quality control, sales and administration departments. At present Clay Paky exports 95% of its production through a global sales and service organization represented by a dealer network active in more than 80 countries around the world.

On December 20, 2022, Osram sold the company to the Arri group.

Claypaky History

The Claypaky company was founded in August 1976, taking its name from the shortened, anglicized form of the name of its founder, Pasquale (Paky) Quadri, one of the first entrepreneurs to realize that technological developments in lighting would have an enormous future in the show business and entertainment world.

In 1982 Claypaky presented the Astrodisco, which used a single lamp to project multiple rays of colored light across ceilings and dance floors. Five years later it launched Brilliant, a digitally controlled moving head and forerunner of a new generation of “intelligent” projectors. This was followed in 1988 by the programmable Golden Scan, a moving mirror projector and the first luminaire to implement stepper motor technology instead of servo motors.

Acclaimed by the specialised press as “the world’s most popular and best-selling projector”, the Golden Scan became a commonly used lighting effect at nightclubs and rock concerts during the late 1980s and the 1990s. The London rock band Klaxons claimed the projector was the inspiration behind their light-themed, hit single Golden Skans.

Since 2000, Claypaky has also been developing its offer for indoor and outdoor architectural applications. In 2002 it moved its headquarters to a new industrial complex in Seriate (Bergamo), achieving certification for compliance with the UNI EN ISO 9001 quality standard that same year.

Claypaky has experienced constant growth, reporting revenues of more than 50 million euro for 2011, up by over 50% from 2010 (33 million euro). It has a workforce of nearly 200 people.

After its founder passed away in 2014, the company was sold to Osram. Afterwards, Claypaky was acquired by the Arri Group in December 2022.

Awards
Over the past two decades, Claypaky’s dedication to innovation has been recognized with more than forty international awards.

The MoMS - Museum of Modern Showlighting
A project conceived by Pasquale Quadri (1947-2014) and formally opened in 2015 — the UNESCO International Year of Light — the Museum of Modern Showlighting (MoMS) is the first European museum that specifically covers all the sectors where showlighting plays a vital role.

The museum investigates the chronology of advances in lighting technology in parallel with the development of the socio-cultural context.

After a brief historical excursus on stage lighting beginning in ancient Greece, the exhibition focuses attention on the 1980s and the development of lighting effects that have become part of our collective memory through musicals such as “Saturday Night Fever”. It then comes to the present and the complex motorised projectors available on today’s market.

The museum has a library consisting of an historical archive of reviews and a multimedia room.

See also
Stage lighting
Stage lighting instruments
Intelligent lighting

References

External links
 Official website

Stage lighting
Stage lighting instruments
Lighting brands
Electronics companies established in 1976
Italian companies established in 1976
2022 mergers and acquisitions